Brachyglottis perdicioides is a species of flowering plant in the family Asteraceae. It is found only in New Zealand.

References

perdicioides
Flora of New Zealand
Near threatened plants
Taxonomy articles created by Polbot
Endemic flora of New Zealand